Sergeant Daniel G. Caldwell (June 1, 1842 – April 15, 1917) was an American soldier who fought in the American Civil War. Caldwell received the country's highest award for bravery during combat, the Medal of Honor, for his action during the Battle of Hatcher's Run in Virginia on 6 February 1865. He was honored with the award on 25 February 1865.

Biography
Caldwell was born in Marble Hill, Pennsylvania on 1 June 1842. He enlisted in the 13th Pennsylvania Cavalry on 28 August 1862. After earning the Medal of Honor he was promoted to 2nd lieutenant. He served until the end of the war when he was mustered out on 14 July 1865.

Caldwall died on 15 April 1917 and his remains are interred at Mount Peace Cemetery in Philadelphia.

Medal of Honor citation

See also

List of American Civil War Medal of Honor recipients: A–F

References

1842 births
1917 deaths
People of Pennsylvania in the American Civil War
Union Army officers
United States Army Medal of Honor recipients
American Civil War recipients of the Medal of Honor
Burials at Mount Peace Cemetery